Marcos Restrepo (born 1961, Catarama, Ecuador)  Restrepo is a Latin American painter who is a member of the artist group Artefactoría, founded by Xavier Patiño. Artefactoría was formed in 1982 by a group of painters from the School of Fine Arts in Guayaquil who are inspired by the surrealists and the unconscious.  Members of Artefactoria include: Restrepo, Xavier Patiño, Jorge Velarde, Pedro Dávila, Marco Alvarado, Flavio Álava, Paco Cuesta

In 1996, Restrepo obtained the Second Prize of the V Biennial of International Madness in River Basin, Ecuador for his painting Al Finál del Hueco (shown right).  In 1986, Restrepo obtained an honorable mention in the Hall Prize of Paris chiquito.

Some exhibitions
1977 - Hall October, Guayaquil
1978 - Young Painting, Guayaquil
1980 - Hall Julio, Guayaquil
1982 - Pinacoteca of the Central bank of Ecuador, Guayaquil
1983 - Hall Vicente Rocafuerte, Guayaquil
1985 - Contemporary sacred art of Ecuador, Guayaquil
1989 - I Hall Art PROESA, Quito
1992 - Permanent Exhibition Seville 92
1997 - Shared worlds, National Museum of the Central bank of Ecuador, Quito
2006 - Museo Municipal de Arte Moderno, Exposición del Fondo Patrimonial del Museo,  Cuenca, Ecuador

References

Contemporary painters
Ecuadorian painters
1961 births
Living people